Bródki may refer to the following places:
Bródki, Greater Poland Voivodeship (west-central Poland)
Bródki, Lublin Voivodeship (east Poland)
Bródki, Lubusz Voivodeship (west Poland)